The 1989 Auckland City mayoral election was part of the New Zealand local elections held that same year. In 1989, elections were held for the Mayor of Auckland plus other local government positions including twenty-four city councillors. The polling was conducted using the standard first-past-the-post electoral method.

Background

The 1989 local elections were the first following a major overhaul of local government in New Zealand. The existing Auckland City Council remained in place but greatly expanded, absorbing several surrounding borough councils. Incumbent Mayor Catherine Tizard, a Labour Party backed candidate, was re-elected with a huge majority while the council saw a strong performance by the Citizens & Ratepayers ticket.

Mayoralty results
The following table gives the election results:

Ward results

Candidates were also elected from wards to the Auckland City Council.

References

Mayoral elections in Auckland
1989 elections in New Zealand
Politics of the Auckland Region
1980s in Auckland
October 1989 events in New Zealand